The Buckaroo Kid is a 1926 American silent Western film directed by Lynn Reynolds and starring Hoot Gibson. It was produced and distributed by Universal Pictures and is based on the short story Oh, Promise Me by Peter B. Kyne that appeared in Collier's Magazine on August 20, 1926.

A copy survives in the Museum of Modern Art.

Cast
 Hoot Gibson as Ed Harley
 Ethel Shannon as Lyra Radigan
 Burr McIntosh as Henry Radigan
 Harry Todd as Tom Darby
 James Gordon as James Mulford
 Clark Comstock as Ranch Manager (uncredited)
 Newton House as Ed Harley as a Boy (uncredited)
 Arthur Millett as Bodyguard (uncredited)
 Joe Rickson as McIntyre
 Arthur Thalasso as Bodyguard (uncredited)

References

External links

 
 

1926 films
Films directed by Lynn Reynolds
Universal Pictures films
Films based on short fiction
1926 Western (genre) films
American black-and-white films
Silent American Western (genre) films
1920s American films
1920s English-language films